Horatio is a feature on Earth's Moon, a crater in Taurus-Littrow valley.  Astronauts Eugene Cernan and Harrison Schmitt drove the Lunar Roving Vehicle along its south rim in 1972, on the Apollo 17 mission, but did not stop.

The larger Camelot crater is to the northeast.  Geology Station 5 is along the south rim of Camelot.  Victory is to the northwest, and Brontë is to the southwest.

The crater was named by the astronauts after the fictional Horatio Hornblower from the works of C. S. Forester.

References

External links
43D1S2(25) Apollo 17 Traverses at Lunar and Planetary Institute
Geological Investigation of the Taurus-Littrow Valley: Apollo 17 Landing Site

Impact craters on the Moon
Apollo 17